Koduri Marakathamani Keeravani (Telugu: కోడూరి మరకతమణి కీరవాణి; 4 July 1961) is an Indian music composer, record producer, singer, and lyricist who predominantly works in Telugu cinema. His accolades include an Academy Award, a Golden Globe Award, a LAFCA Award, a Critics' Choice Movie Award, a National Film Award, eight Filmfare Awards and eleven Nandi Awards. In 2023, the Government of India honoured him with the Padma Shri for his contributions towards Indian cinema.

Keeravani also worked for a few Hindi, Tamil, Kannada, and Malayalam films. He is best known for his compositions in works such as Kshana Kshanam (1991), Gharana Mogudu (1992), Allari Priyudu (1993), Criminal (1994), Subha Sankalpam (1995), Pelli Sandadi (1996), Devaraagam (1996), Annamayya (1997), Zakhm (1998), Student No.1 (2001), Jism (2003), Paheli (2005), Sri Ramadasu (2006), Magadheera (2009), Baahubali series (2015 and 2017), and RRR (2022).

Early and personal life 
Keeravaani was born into a Telugu speaking family in Kovvur, West Godavari district, Andhra Pradesh to Koduri Siva Shakthi Datta, a lyricist and screenwriter. He is the cousin of director S. S. Rajamouli and music composers M. M. Srilekha and Kalyani Malik. He is the nephew of screenwriter V. Vijayendra Prasad.

His wife M. M. Srivalli works as a line producer in films. His elder son, Kaala Bhairava, is a singer and has sung for his father's numerous compositions ("Dandalayya" song). His younger son, Sri Simha, made his debut with Mathu Vadalara (2019).

Career 

Keeravani first began his career as an assistant music director with Telugu composer K. Chakravarthy and Malayalam composer C. Rajamani in 1987. He assisted in movies such as Collectorgari Abbayi and  Bharathamlo Arjunudu in the late 1980s. During this time, he also sought the guidance of the veteran lyricist Veturi for over a year.

Keeravani's first big break as an independent musician came with the film Kalki in 1990, but the film never got released and the soundtrack also went unnoticed. It was director Mouli's 1990 film Manasu Mamatha that brought him to the limelight and was considered his first released movie. However, it was Ram Gopal Varma's blockbuster film Kshana Kshanam (1991) that made Keeravani an established music director. All the songs of this movie went on to become top chartbusters and Keeravani was flooded with offers from all across south Indian film industries. His first major Hindi film was Criminal (1994).

Keeravani mentions John Williams and Nusrat Fateh Ali Khan as composers who influenced him. Some of the films which inspired his music include Fiddler On The Roof (1964), Coming to America (1988), Phone Booth (2002).

Discography

Awards and nominations 
Keeravani won the Oscar Award for Best Original Song and the Golden Globe Award for Best Original Song for "Naatu Naatu" for the 2022 Telugu film RRR. He received a National Film Award for Best Music Direction for the 1997 Telugu film Annamayya. He is also a recipient of eight Filmfare Awards, eleven Andhra Pradesh state Nandi Awards, and a Tamil Nadu State Film Award. He was also nominated for Saturn Award for Best Music for Baahubali: The Beginning (2015).

Civilian Honours
 2023 – Padma Shri, Government of India, 

Oscars

 2023 – Academy Award for Best Original Song for Naatu Naatu - Won

Critic's Choice Movie Awards

 2023 – Critics' Choice Movie Award for Best Song for "Naatu Naatu" – Won

Golden Globe Awards
2023 – Golden Globe Award for Best Original Song for Naatu Naatu – Won

National Film Awards
 1997 – National Film Award for Best Music Direction for Annamayya – Won

Filmfare Awards South

Nandi Awards

Tamil Nadu State Film Awards
 1991 – Tamil Nadu State Film Award for Best Music Director for Azhagan - Won

Santosham Film Awards
 2003 – Santosham Best Music Director Award for Gangotri – Won

South Indian International Movie Awards
 2018 – SIIMA Award for Best Music Director (Telugu) for Baahubali 2: The Conclusion – Won
 2021 – SIIMA Award for Best Lyricist (Telugu) for NTR: Kathanayakudu – Nominated

See also 
 List of Indian winners and nominees of the Golden Globe Awards
 List of Indian winners and nominees of the Academy Awards

References

External links 

Living people
Telugu playback singers
Telugu film score composers
Kannada film score composers
Tamil Nadu State Film Awards winners
Filmfare Awards South winners
Tamil film score composers
1961 births
20th-century Indian composers
Indian male playback singers
20th-century Indian singers
People from West Godavari district
Singers from Andhra Pradesh
Film musicians from Andhra Pradesh
Nandi Award winners
21st-century Indian composers
21st-century Indian singers
Best Music Direction National Film Award winners
Male film score composers
20th-century Indian male singers
21st-century Indian male singers
South Indian International Movie Awards winners
Filmfare Awards winners
Golden Globe Award winners
Golden Globe Award-winning musicians
Recipients of the Padma Shri in arts
Best Original Song Academy Award-winning songwriters
Indian Academy Award winners